Bochy is a surname. Notable people with the surname include:

Brett Bochy (born 1987), American baseball player, son of Bruce
Bruce Bochy (born 1955), American baseball player and manager

See also
Bachy (surname)